Ratan may refer to:

 Rätan, locality in Sweden
 RATAN-600

See also
 Rattan (disambiguation)